Maulin, at , is the 272nd–highest peak in Ireland on the Arderin scale, however, being below 600 m it does not rank on the Vandeleur-Lynam or Hewitt scales. Maulin is in the far northeastern section of the Wicklow Mountains, at the mouth of Glensoulan Valley; Powerscourt Waterfall lies at its base.  

Maulin is accessed from the trails through Crone Woods, a Sitka spruce plantation on its northern slopes; Maulin is also accessible just off the main Wicklow Way. Maulin is often climbed as part of a "loop route" called the Circuit of Glensoulan which starts at Crone Woods car-park, and complete a 16-kilometre loop of Maulin, Tonduff , War Hill , and Djouce , and then returning to Crone Woods car-park.

The Knockree An Óige youth hostel is located at the base of Maulin in Lackandarragh near the village of Enniskerry.

Bibliography

See also

Wicklow Way
Wicklow Mountains
Lists of mountains in Ireland
List of mountains of the British Isles by height
List of Hewitt mountains in England, Wales and Ireland

References

External links
MountainViews: The Irish Mountain Website, Maulin
MountainViews: Irish Online Mountain Database
The Database of British and Irish Hills , the largest database of British Isles mountains ("DoBIH")
Hill Bagging UK & Ireland, the searchable interface for the DoBIH

Mountains and hills of County Wicklow
Geography of County Wicklow
Hewitts of Ireland